Yengejeh, Yangijeh, Yengeyeh, Yangjeh, Yengejah, also rendered as Engija, Yangidzha, or Yengidzha may refer to:

Castles 

 Yengejeh Castle

Residential places

Ardabil Province
Yengejeh, Meshgin Shahr, Ardabil Province
Yengejeh, Namin, Ardabil Province
Yengejeh-ye Molla Mohammad Hasan, Ardabil Province
Yengejeh-ye Molla Mohammad Reza, Ardabil Province
Yengejeh-ye Qeshlaq, Ardabil Province
Yengejeh-ye Reza Beyglu, Ardabil Province
Yengejeh-ye Reza Beyglu
Yengejeh-ye Molla Mohammad Hasan

East Azerbaijan Province
Yengejeh, Ajab Shir, East Azerbaijan Province
Yengejeh, Azarshahr, East Azerbaijan Province
Yengejeh, Abbas-e Gharbi, Bostanabad County, East Azerbaijan Province
Yengejah, Ujan-e Sharqi, Bostanabad County, East Azerbaijan Province
Yengejeh, Hashtrud, East Azerbaijan Province
Yengejeh, Heris, East Azerbaijan Province
Yengejeh, Maragheh, East Azerbaijan Province
Yengejeh-ye Kord, Marand County, East Azerbaijan Province
Yengejeh-ye Sadat, Marand County, East Azerbaijan Province
Yengejeh-ye Yaranmish, Marand County, East Azerbaijan Province
Yengejeh, Meyaneh, East Azerbaijan Province
Yengejeh-ye Daliganlu, Meyaneh County, East Azerbaijan Province
Yengejah, Sarab, East Azerbaijan Province
Yengejeh-ye Khatun, Shabestar County, East Azerbaijan Province
Yengejeh, Varzaqan, East Azerbaijan Province
Yengejeh Rural District, in East Azerbaijan Province

Hamadan Province
Yangijeh, Hamadan
Yengejeh, Hamadan
Yengejeh-ye Karafs, Hamadan Province

Kurdistan Province
Yangijeh, Kurdistan, a village in Marivan County

Qazvin Province

Razavi Khorasan Province
Yengejeh, Razavi Khorasan

West Azerbaijan Province
Yengejeh, Bukan, a village in Bukan County
Yengejeh, Miandoab, a village in Miandoab County
Yengejeh, Salmas, a village in Salmas County
Yengejeh, Shahin Dezh, a village in Shahin Dezh County
Yengejeh, Nazlu, a village in Urmia County
Yengejeh, Sumay-ye Beradust, a village in Urmia County
Yengejeh-ye Qazi, a village in Urmia County

Zanjan Province
Yengijeh, Zanjan
Yengejeh, Khodabandeh, Zanjan Province
Yengejeh, Mahneshan, Zanjan Province
Yengejeh, Anguran, Mahneshan County, Zanjan Province
Yengejeh-ye Reza Beyglu
Yengejeh-ye Molla Mohammad Hasan

See also
Yengijeh (disambiguation)
Yenkejeh (disambiguation)